Duncan Henry Davidson (born 29 March 1941) is the founder of Persimmon plc, one of the United Kingdom's largest housebuilding businesses. In 2018, it was reported that his wealth had risen by £32 million and he was worth £175 million.

Career
Davidson is the grandson of the 15th Duke of Norfolk and educated at Ampleforth College. He was a pageboy at the Coronation of Elizabeth II and nine years later worked as a labourer on London's Blackwall Tunnel.

He went into the British Army in 1959 and served in the Royal Scots Greys for four years. In 1963 he joined George Wimpey where he managed construction work in Iran.

In 1965, he founded Ryedale Homes which he sold seven years later to Comben Homes for £1 million.
In 1972, he founded Persimmon plc and expanded it into one of the United Kingdom's largest housebuilding businesses. He retired as Executive Chairman in 2006 but remains Life President.

He owns  of land in Northumberland and lives at Lilburn Tower near Wooler.

Family
Duncan Davidson married Sarah in 1966; the couple have four daughters.

References

1941 births
People educated at Ampleforth College
Royal Scots Greys officers
English businesspeople
Living people
People from Wooler